Polysiphonia simulans is a small marine alga in the division Rhodophyta.

Description
This small alga is no more than 8 cm long. It appears as a tuft of irregularly branched erect axes. The branches show 10 periaxial cells forming a collar around a central axis without cortication. The pericentral cells are all of the same length. Rhizoids are attached to the lower periaxial cells.

Reproduction
Tetraspores have been recorded in the final branches.

Distribution
Recorded from the south coast of England, Ireland and the Channel Islands. Also recorded from north-west France. Occurs southwards to Morocco.

References

Rhodomelaceae